Coelophora is a genus of ladybird beetles in the family Coccinellidae. There are about 14 described species in Coelophora.

Species
These 14 species belong to the genus Coelophora:
 Coelophora atrolineata Fairmaire, 1881
 Coelophora biplagiata (Swartz, 1808)
 Coelophora bissellata Mulsant, 1850
 Coelophora bowringii Crotch, 1874
 Coelophora circumusta (Mulsant, 1850)
 Coelophora duvaucelii (Mulsant, 1850)
 Coelophora impunctata
 Coelophora inaequalis (Fabricius, 1775)  (common Australian or variable lady beetle)
 Coelophora jansoni
 Coelophora machadoi
 Coelophora mulsanti (Montrouzier, 1861)
 Coelophora pupillata (Swartz, 1808) (tenspotted lady beetle)
 Coelophora quadrivittata Fauvel, 1903
 Coelophora saucia (Mulsant, 1850)

References

Further reading

External links

 

Coccinellidae
Coccinellidae genera